Lillian is an unincorporated community in Johnson County, Texas, United States.

Education
Lillian is part of the Alvarado Independent School District. Lillian Elementary School, which serves students in grades pre-kindergarten through four, is located in the community.

The Lillian Independent School District consolidated into Alvarado ISD on July 1, 1986.

Notable people
Wingo Anderson, baseball player.

Climate
The climate in this area is characterized by hot, humid summers and generally mild to cool winters.  According to the Köppen Climate Classification system, Lillian has a humid subtropical climate, abbreviated "Cfa" on climate maps.

References

Unincorporated communities in Johnson County, Texas
Unincorporated communities in Texas
Dallas–Fort Worth metroplex